Justine Picardie is a British novelist, fashion writer and biographer. She  is a former editor-in-chief of Harper's Bazaar UK and Town & Country UK. Her 2010 biography of Coco Chanel was shortlisted for the Galaxy National Book Awards.

Her eldest son is Jamie MacColl, the guitarist for Bombay Bicycle Club.

Works

References

Living people
Writers from London
English women novelists
English magazine editors
English biographers
Alumni of Selwyn College, Cambridge
English women non-fiction writers
Women magazine editors
Year of birth missing (living people)
Women biographers